The N'Zo Partial Faunal Reserve is a designated site in Côte d'Ivoire, given status in 1971.

Together with Tai National Park this reserve holds nearly half the total population of chimpanzees in Cote d'Ivore (Kormos et al.2003).

References

Kormos, R., Boesch, C. Bakarr, M. I. and Butynaski, T. M. 2003. West African Chimpanzees. Status Survey and Conservation Action Plan. IUCN/SSC Primate Specialist Group. IUCN, Gland, Switzerland and Cambridge, UK.

Protected areas of Ivory Coast
Protected areas established in 1971
Faunal reserves
1971 establishments in Ivory Coast